Stephanie Regina Bush-Baskette (born March 16, 1953), also known as Stephanie R. Bush, is an American attorney and Democratic Party politician from New Jersey who served in the New Jersey General Assembly representing the 27th district from 1988 to 1992.

Biography
Bush was born in East Orange in 1953. She graduated from East Orange High School and received a baccalaureate degree in psychology from Cornell University. She later received a J.D. degree from American University and became a principal at a firm in East Orange. She had also been the president of the New Jersey Association of Black Women Lawyers and served on the East Orange Zoning Board of Adjustment.

In 1987, the Essex County Democratic Party Organization selected Bush to have the Organization line in that year's General Assembly primary ballot alongside Harry A. McEnroe after dropping incumbent Mildred Barry Garvin. They won in the primary and went onto win the general election. While in the Assembly, Bush sponsored the state's Family Leave Act and a raise in the state's minimum wage. She subsequently won reelection to the Assembly in 1989 and 1991. On September 21, 1992, Governor James Florio named Bush to be the Commissioner of the New Jersey Department of Community Affairs.

After leaving the Department of Community Affairs, Bush earned a PhD from Rutgers University in criminal justice. She later taught at Rutgers University–Newark as a professor in metropolitan studies. , she is the business administrator for the City of Bridgeton.

References

External links
Law Offices of Stephanie R. Bush-Baskette, LLC

1953 births
Living people
Cornell University alumni
American University alumni
East Orange High School alumni
Rutgers University alumni
Rutgers University faculty
Politicians from East Orange, New Jersey
New Jersey lawyers
African-American women lawyers
African-American lawyers
African-American state legislators in New Jersey
Women state legislators in New Jersey
Democratic Party members of the New Jersey General Assembly
American women academics
21st-century African-American people
21st-century African-American women
20th-century African-American people
20th-century African-American women